Shorea balangeran, called (along with some other species in the genus Shorea) red balau, is a species of plant in the family Dipterocarpaceae. It is native to Sumatra and Borneo. It is a Vulnerable species threatened by habitat loss.

References

External links
 
 

balangeran
Trees of Borneo
Trees of Sumatra
Flora of Kalimantan
Taxonomy articles created by Polbot